Michael Howard, Baron Howard of Lympne (born 1941) is a British politician.

Michael Howard may also refer to:

Arts and entertainment
 Michael Howard (comedian) (1916–1988), British actor and comedian
 Michael Howard (musician) (1922–2002), English choral conductor, organist and composer
 Michael Howard (American actor) (1923–2019), American actor and teacher
 Michael Howard (filmmaker) (born 1978), American filmmaker, photographer, and actor
 Michael Howard Studios, an acting studio in Manhattan, New York

Sports
 Michael Howard (fencer) (born 1928), British Olympian
 Mike Howard (born 1958), baseball player
 Michael Howard (Australian footballer) (born 1965)
 Michael Howard (footballer, born 1978), English footballer
 Michael Howard (footballer, born 1999), English footballer

Other
 Michael Howard (Irish politician) (1933–2009), Fine Gael politician
 Michael Howard (historian) (1922–2019), British military historian
 Michael Howard, 21st Earl of Suffolk (1935–2022), English peer
 Michael Howard (Microsoft) (born 1965), in software security
 Michael Howard (Luciferian) (1948–2015), English  author
 Michael Howard (American politician) (born 1983/84)
 Michael L. Howard, US Army general